Amir ol Mowmenin (also Romanized as Amīr ol Mow’menīn and Amīr ol Mo’menīn) is a village in Abezhdan Rural District, Abezhdan District, Andika County, Khuzestan Province, Iran. At the 2006 census, its population was 186, in 40 families.

References 

Populated places in Andika County